Cowan Creek is located in New South Wales, Australia. It is a tidal subcatchment of the Hawkesbury River. Almost all of the catchment lies within Ku-ring-gai Chase National Park. Tributaries include Coal and Candle Creek, which branches off from Cowan Creek at Cottage Point and Smiths Creek.

Creeks and canals of Sydney
Hawkesbury River